Earl Gilson (July 1, 1923 – September 4, 2004) was a member of the Wisconsin State Assembly.

Biography
Gilson was born on July 1, 1923, in De Pere, Wisconsin. He graduated from high school in Fond du Lac, Wisconsin before attending Colorado State University. During World War II, Gilson served in the United States Army Air Forces. He later transferred to the United States Air Force and would altogether serve twenty years in the military. Gilson is married with two children and is a member of The Nature Conservancy and the local chapter of the Humane Society of the United States. He was a professor at Colorado State University and later at University of Wisconsin–River Falls. He died on September 4, 2004, in Port Angeles, Washington from myelofibrosis.

Political career
Gilson was elected to the Assembly in 1982. He was a Democrat.

References

People from De Pere, Wisconsin
Politicians from Fond du Lac, Wisconsin
Military personnel from Wisconsin
United States Army Air Forces soldiers
United States Air Force airmen
United States Army personnel of World War II
Colorado State University alumni
Colorado State University faculty
University of Wisconsin–River Falls faculty
1923 births
2004 deaths
20th-century American politicians
Democratic Party members of the Wisconsin State Assembly